William Corindon was an Oxford college head in the 16th century.

Corindon was  educated at Exeter College, Oxford, graduating B.A. in 1545, M.A. in 1548, and D.D. in 1556. He was a Fellow of Exeter in 1543; and its rector from 1553 to 1555.

References

Alumni of Exeter College, Oxford
Fellows of Exeter College, Oxford
Rectors of Exeter College, Oxford
16th-century English people